Batlava Lake refers to both a lake and resort located in Kosovo.

History 
The village of Batlava is inhabited by Albanians. The artificial lake was created during the communist era as a water supply source for the Pristina and Podujevo regions.

Present day 
Batlava Lake is the main source of potable water for the cities of Pristina and Podujevo, but not Orllan itself, where the lake is located. As a result of the cities' population growth, withdrawal regularly exceeds inflow, especially in summer.

Batlava Lake is a popular destination for locals. Thus, tourism is a large revenue source for the local village. The lake is in the Lab region and is fed by the Batlava River from the north. The village of Koliq is also located quite near the lake.

See also
Water in Pristina

Notes and references 

Notes:

References:

Lakes of Kosovo